Adrian Darnell "AJ" Griffin Jr. (born August 25, 2003) is an American professional basketball player for the Atlanta Hawks of the National Basketball Association (NBA). He played college basketball for the Duke Blue Devils of the Atlantic Coast Conference (ACC).

High school career
Griffin was a starter on the varsity basketball team in Ossining, New York as a 7th and 8th grader in 2015-16 alongside senior Obi Toppin. Griffin played basketball for Archbishop Stepinac High School in White Plains, New York. As a freshman, he played with his older brother, Alan, and helped his team win its first Catholic High School Athletic Association (CHSAA) Archdiocesan title since 1984. In his sophomore season, he and R. J. Davis formed one of the top backcourts in the nation. Griffin averaged 20.9 points, 10.9 rebounds, 3.9 assists and 3.5 blocks per game. As a junior, he averaged 17.7 points, 8.8 rebounds, 2.4 assists, and 2.3 blocks per game, missing most of the season with a knee injury, and led Stepinac to the CHSAA Archdiocesan title. Griffin was sidelined for his senior season by an ankle injury. He was named to the McDonald's All-American Game and Jordan Brand Classic rosters.

Recruiting
Griffin was rated a five-star recruit by 247Sports and Rivals, and a four-star recruit by ESPN. On November 4, 2019, he committed to playing college basketball for Duke over offers from Kentucky and Villanova.

College career
On November 19, 2021, Griffin scored 18 points in an 88–55 win against Lafayette. He was named to the ACC All-Freshman Team as well as Honorable Mention All-ACC. At the conclusion of his freshman season, Griffin announced his intention to enter the 2022 NBA draft. Ahead of the draft, Griffin was projected as a potential top five pick.

Professional career

Atlanta Hawks (2022–present) 
Griffin was selected with the 16th overall pick by the Atlanta Hawks in the 2022 NBA draft. He later joined the Hawks' 2022 NBA Summer League team. On July 3, 2022, the Hawks signed Griffin to a rookie-scale contract. On November 19, Griffin put up 17 points, alongside a game-winning alley-oop, five rebounds, an assist, a steal, and a block in a 124–122 win over the Toronto Raptors. On December 11, Griffin scored another game-winning alley-oop in a 123–122 win over the Chicago Bulls.

National team career
Griffin represented the United States at the 2019 FIBA Under-16 Americas Championship in Brazil. He averaged 13.5 points, 4.3 rebounds and 3.3 steals per game, helping his team win the gold medal. Griffin scored 18 points against Canada in the final.

Personal life
Griffin is a Christian and often takes to social media to speak about his faith. Griffin's father, Adrian, played in the National Basketball Association (NBA) for ten seasons before becoming a coach in the league, and serves as an assistant coach for the Toronto Raptors. His mother, Audrey Sterling, was an All-American in track and ran for Seton Hall. His oldest sister is Vanessa. His other two siblings have played college basketball: his brother, Alan, at Illinois and Syracuse, and his sister, Aubrey, at UConn.

References

External links
Duke Blue Devils bio
USA Basketball bio

2003 births
Living people
American men's basketball players
Archbishop Stepinac High School alumni
Atlanta Hawks draft picks
Atlanta Hawks players
Basketball players from Dallas
Basketball players from New York (state)
Duke Blue Devils men's basketball players
McDonald's High School All-Americans
People from White Plains, New York
Small forwards